The Wisconsin Warriors were a football team in the Independent Women's Football League. Based in Greendale, the Warriors played their home games on the campus of Greendale High School. The Warriors were the defending IWFL North American Champions of 2009.

History

2008
The Warriors were formed in 2007, continuing a legacy of women's football in SE Wisconsin perpetuated by the Wisconsin Riveters and Northern Ice among other teams.  Their inaugural season was a struggle, as the Warriors only finished 2-6 and fourth place in the Midwest Division.

2009
In 2009 (after they had already been assigned a Tier I-strength schedule), the Warriors opted to move to Tier II.  Though they had only finished 4-4 on the regular season, their team rating/strength of schedule (being the only Tier II team to pick up two wins against Tier I-both vs. the Minnesota Vixen), the Warriors wrapped up home-field advantage throughout the playoffs.  In the first round, the Warriors dominated the Chattanooga Locomotion with a 32-6 victory. that task was not much more difficult in the following round; thanks to a 28-6 win over the Carolina Phoenix, the Warriors won the Regional Championship. On July 25, the Warriors won the IWFL Tier II North American Championship, defeating the defending champion Montreal Blitz, 42-14, at Round Rock ISD Athletic Stadium in Round Rock, Texas (a suburb of Austin).

2010
They finished 6-4 in 2010, won their division and beat the Memphis Belles in the quarterfinals of the Tier II playoffs but did not win the Tier that year as they lost in the semifinals.

2011
They moved up to Tier I in 2011. The Warriors were featured on Fox 6 twice. They would finish 8-0 that year, their first ever undefeated season, claimed the Midwest division title and made the Tier I playoffs where they would win a quarterfinal. But once again, they lost in the semifinals and wouldn't win the Tier title in 2011.

Season-By-Season 

|-
|2008 || 2 || 6 || 0 || 4th East Midwest || --
|-
|2009 || 7 || 4 || 0 || 1st Tier II || Won Tier II Quarterfinal (Chattanooga)Won Tier II Semifinal (Carolina)Won Tier II Championship (Montreal)
|-
|2010 || 6 || 4 || 0 || 2nd Tier II West || Won Tier II Midwest Division (Memphis)
|-
|2011 || 9 || 1 || 0 || 2nd Tier I West || Won Tier I Midwest Division 
|-
|2012* || 9 || 1 || 0 || 2nd Tier I West || Won Midwest Division 
|-
!Totals || 33 || 16 || 0
|colspan="2"|(including playoffs)

* = Current Standing

Season Schedules

2009

2010

References

External links
 IWFL website

Independent Women's Football League
Greendale, Wisconsin
American football teams in Wisconsin
American football teams established in 2008
2008 establishments in Wisconsin
Women in Wisconsin